Lieutenant Ernest Andrew Mustard (1893-1971) was a World War I flying ace credited with five aerial victories. He returned to service during World War II with the Royal Australian Air Force (RAAF).  Lt. Mustard flew Avro Lancaster bombers during World War II with a mixed crew of RAAF and Royal Canadian Air Force personnel.  One bomb aimer on his crew was named Alexander Philip Mustard.  Lt. Mustard was also responsible for the first aerial survey of Australia's Barrier Reef.

Sources of information

References

1893 births
1971 deaths
Australian World War I flying aces
People from Oakleigh, Victoria
Military personnel from Melbourne
Royal Australian Air Force personnel of World War II
Australian recipients of the Distinguished Flying Cross (United Kingdom)